Dennis Bovell  (born 22 May 1953) is a Barbados-born reggae guitarist, bass player and record producer, based in England. He was a member of the British reggae band Matumbi, and released dub-reggae records under his own name as well as the pseudonym Blackbeard. He is most widely known for his decades-spanning collaborations with Linton Kwesi Johnson.

Biography
Born in Saint Peter, Barbados, in 1953, Bovell moved to South London in 1965 and became immersed in Jamaican culture, particularly dub music, setting up his own Jah Sufferer sound system. Running the sound system brought trouble from the police and Bovell was imprisoned for six months on remand, but was later released on appeal. Bovell was friends at school with future rock musicians including keyboardist Nick Straker and record producer Tony Mansfield, both of whom later worked with Bovell. He formed Matumbi in the mid-1970s.
 
Bovell also worked as an engineer at Dip Records, the precursor to the Lovers Rock label, and he was a key figure in the early days of the lovers rock genre. He is also known for attempting to fuse disco rhythms with reggae, most notably with the hit song "Silly Games" by Janet Kay. According to Bovell, he wrote "Silly Games" with the sole intent of it being a hit song.

He has produced albums by a wide variety of artists including I-Roy, the Thompson Twins, Sharon Shannon, Alpha Blondy, Bananarama, the Pop Group, Fela Kuti, the Slits, Orange Juice and Madness. He has collaborated with poet, Linton Kwesi Johnson for much of his working life.

Bovell also co-wrote and co-produced the majority of material by British reggae singer Bobby Kray.

In 1980, he wrote the score for Franco Rosso's film Babylon. Bovell has also written music for the 1983 television drama The Boy Who Won the Pools and Global Revolution (2006).

In the BBC's Reggae Britannia, Bovell related a tale of strange goings on in the leafy London suburb of Barnes, where the John Hassell Recordings studio was based in a residential house, in a quiet street at 21 Nassau Road. John Hassell, aided by his wife Felicity, cut reggae dubplates with such finesse and understanding that the studio's output was to feed sound systems throughout the UK.

In 2012, Bovell produced the album Mek It Run.

In 2013 he collaborated with dub producer / musician Gaudi, playing bass on his track "I Start To Pray" featuring Lee "Scratch" Perry and The Orb, included on Gaudi album In Between Times Six Degrees Records.

In Steve McQueen's 2020 film Lovers Rock, the second in his five-part anthology series Small Axe, Bovell has a cameo role and his song "Silly Games" is prominently featured.

Bovell was appointed Member of the Order of the British Empire (MBE) in the 2021 Birthday Honours for services to music.

Discography
Strictly Dub Wize (1978), Tempus – as Blackbeard
I Wah Dub (1980), More Cut/EMI – as Blackbeard
Dub Conference (Winston Edwards & Blackbeard at 10 Downing Street) (1980), Studio 16 – with Winston Edwards
Brain Damage (1981), Fontana
Audio Active (1986), Moving Target – as Dennis Bovell and the Dub Band
Dub Dem Silly (1993), Arawak
Tactics (1994), LKJ
Dub of Ages (2003), LKJ
All Over the World (2006)
Dub Dem Silly Volume 2 (2006), Arawak – Dennis Bovell featuring Janet Kay
Corean Jamaican Connection, Powerslave – Yoonkee meets Dennis Bovell
Dub Outside (2011), Double Six – Steve Mason & Dennis Bovell
Mek It Run (2012), Pressure Sounds
Dub 4 Daze (2015), Glitterbeat Records

Compilations 

Decibel: More Cuts and Dubs 1976–1983 (2003), Pressure Sounds
Dub Master (1993), Jamaican Gold
Vibrativa – Mas Que Mirar (2010), Sonofotron Records

Appearances

References

External links
Dennis Bovell page at LKJ Records
Dennis Bovell page on MySpace

1953 births
Living people
People from Saint Peter, Barbados
British reggae musicians
British record producers
Barbadian emigrants to England
Black British musicians
British bass guitarists
Male bass guitarists
Barbadian reggae musicians
Members of the Order of the British Empire